Mustapha El Karouni (7 August 1968 – 8 December 2021) was a Belgian politician of the Reformist Movement. He served as a lawyer within the Brussels Bar after graduating with a law degree from the University of Liège. He earned a doctorate from Paris 1 Panthéon-Sorbonne University in 2003.

From 29 June 2007 to 7 June 2009, he served in the Parliament of the Brussels-Capital Region, finishing the term of the late Jacques Simonet.

References

1968 births
2021 deaths
21st-century Belgian politicians
Reformist Movement politicians
Members of the Parliament of the Brussels-Capital Region
University of Liège alumni
People from Liège Province
Belgian people of Moroccan descent